Intro Bonito is the debut mixtape by British indie pop band Kero Kero Bonito. It was self-released by the band on 30 September 2013, followed by a reissue on 25 August 2014 by Double Denim Records. It was promoted by the singles "Homework" and "Sick Beat" and the title track received a music video. A remix EP called Bonito Recycling was released on 29 September 2014.

The song "I'd Rather Sleep" went viral on TikTok in 2020. Intro Bonito was listed as the 46th best album of the 2010s by Gorilla vs. Bear.

Composition
Many of the songs featured on the mixtape were written with a Casio SA-45 mini-keyboard.  The song "Sick Beat" is about "kicking someone's arse on a computer game" and contains elements of dancehall, hip hop, J-pop, and '90s club music. The album's lyrical themes touch on "concise, pop-haiku-like explorations of the strangeness of babies, ecological issues or societal expectations of women" sung in playground chant-like melodies.

Release
Intro Bonito was originally self-released by the band via Bandcamp. Double Denim Records eventually reached out and inquired if the label could re-issue the mixtape on CD. Intro Bonito was also re-issued in Japan by the label Magniph.

Track listing

References

2013 mixtape albums
Debut mixtape albums
Kero Kero Bonito albums
Self-released albums
Hyperpop albums
Dance music albums by British artists
Hip hop albums by British artists